is a Prefectural Natural Park in Iwate Prefecture, Japan. Established in 1974, the park spans the municipalities of Ichinoseki and Rikuzentakata.

See also
 National Parks of Japan

References

External links
  Map of Murone Kōgen Prefectural Natural Park

Parks and gardens in Iwate Prefecture
Protected areas established in 1974
1974 establishments in Japan